Ophichthus kunaloa is an eel in the family Ophichthidae (worm/snake eels). It was described by John E. McCosker in 1979. It is a marine, temperate water-dwelling eel which is known from the Hawaiian Islands, in the eastern central Pacific Ocean.

References

kunaloa
Taxa named by John E. McCosker
Fish described in 1979